Fergus Barrowman (born 1961)  is a New Zealand publisher and literary commentator. He has been the publisher at Victoria University Press since 1985.

Career
In addition to running Victoria University Press, Barrowman also edited and published the New Zealand literary magazine Sport from 1988 until its final issue in 2019. He co-founded the magazine with Elizabeth Knox, Damien Wilkins and  Nigel Cox. The name was Barrowman's idea and he intended it to be a playful reference to the divide between the worlds of sport and literature. He noted in 2005 that the name can cause problems: "I still get people saying I've never looked at Sport because I don't like sport".

Sport published the first works of Emily Perkins and Catherine Chidgey, as well as being an early publisher of Kate Flannery, Annamarie Jagose, Chris Orsman and Peter Wells. In 2008, Eleanor Catton's work first appeared in Sport, before the publication of her first novel The Rehearsal.

In 1996 Barrowman edited The Picador Book of Contemporary New Zealand Fiction. David Eggleton, in a review for The Dominion Post, commented: "Barrowman displays genuine talent as a connoisseur, showing us why we should sit up and take notice of the best of New Zealand writing." Michael Morrissey in the Sunday Star-Times was critical, however, saying that the anthology was dominated by Wellington writers and that important contemporary short story writers such as Michael Gifkins and Sherridan Keith had been omitted. He concluded: "This is a great collection marred by some regrettable omissions and by aggressive Wellington agendas."

In June 2014, Barrowman was made a member of the New Zealand Order of Merit for services to publishing.

Personal life
As of 2020 Barrowman lives in Wellington with his wife, the author Elizabeth Knox, and their son, Jack. Barrowman and Knox met when he was involved in publishing her first book, After Z-Hour (1987), and married in 1989.

See also
New Zealand literature
Victoria University of Wellington

References

External links

Interview with Fergus Barrowman on the Unity Books website
Interview with Fergus Barrowman (among others) in The Dominion Post
Interview with Fergus Barrowman on Elsewhere.co.nz

People from Wellington City
New Zealand publishers (people)
1961 births
Living people